The following lists events that happened in 1933 in Iceland.

Incumbents
Monarch – Kristján X
Prime Minister – Ásgeir Ásgeirsson

Events
16 July – Icelandic parliamentary election, 1933
21 October – Icelandic prohibition referendum, 1933
1933 Úrvalsdeild

Births
16 April – Helgi Daníelsson, footballer (d. 2014)
30 April – Þorgeir Þorgeirson, writer and film director (d. 2003).
14 June – Gunnar Gunnarsson, footballer
3 October – Halldór Sigurbjörnsson, footballer (d. 1983)

Deaths
7 March – Stefán Sigurðsson, poet (b. 1887)

References

 
1930s in Iceland
Iceland
Iceland
Years of the 20th century in Iceland